The Hours of Henry VIII is a 15th-century illuminated book of hours, painted by Jean Poyet in Tours. Its 400 pages contain 55 full-page miniatures. It is housed under shelfmark MS H.8 in the Morgan Library & Museum, New York.

History
The Hours of Henry VIII, one of Jean Poyer's best-known works, receives its name from "the possible but unproven eighteenth-century tradition" that it was once owned by King Henry VIII of England. The manuscript belonged to several later English kings including George III.

The binding
The manuscript is bound in red velvet. Henry VIII's coat of arms, monogram and motto, "Honi soit qui mal y pense" are contained on the clasps.

On the manuscript's last blank leaf, there is a note supplied by George Wade (1673–1748), one of its owners:

Miniatures

References

Sources
Roger S. Wieck et al., The Hours of Henry VIII, George Braziller/The Morgan Library & Museum
Morgan Library & Museum Hours of Henry VIII
M. Moleiro Editor  The Hours of Henry VIII

Henry 08
15th-century illuminated manuscripts
Collection of the Morgan Library & Museum